César Bosco Vivas Robelo (14 November 1941 – 23 June 2020) was a Nicaraguan Roman Catholic bishop.

Robelo was born in Masaya, Nicaragua and was ordained to the priesthood in 1970. He served as auxiliary bishop of the Roman Catholic Archdiocese of Managua, Nicaragua from 1981 to 1991 and as bishop of the Roman Catholic Diocese of León in Nicaragua, from 1991 to 2019.

Robelo died in 2020 from COVID-19.

Notes

External links

21st-century Roman Catholic bishops in Nicaragua
People from Masaya
1941 births
2020 deaths
20th-century Roman Catholic bishops in Nicaragua
Roman Catholic bishops of León in Nicaragua
Roman Catholic bishops of Managua
Deaths from the COVID-19 pandemic in Nicaragua